is a 1989 platform video game developed and published for the Family Computer  by Namco. A port for the Game Gear was released in 1991.

Gameplay

Enemies cannot be destroyed with Wagan's sound waves, but the player can stand over one while it is stunned. When the player picks up a Waganizer, the sound effects shot by Wagan will become bigger with each increment, allowing the player to stun enemies for longer periods. When a four Waganizers are collected, Wagan will become invincible for a limited period, increasing his walking speed and allowing him to defeat enemies by touching them. However, Wagan will revert to his initial sound effect attack once the invincibility effect wears off. There is no energy gauge in; if the player touches an enemy or falls into a trap, they will lose a single life.

The objective of the game is to reach the end of each action scene by making the best use of Wagan's sound wave attacks and jumping ability. The player must confront a boss at the end of certain stages, but instead of actually fighting the boss in battle, the player is challenged to a mini-game where they must score more points than their opponent.

Reception

Notes

References

External links

1989 video games
Android (operating system) games
Bandai Namco Entertainment franchises
IOS games
Japan-exclusive video games
Mobile games
Namco games
Nintendo DS games
Nintendo DS-only games
Nintendo Entertainment System games
Nintendo Entertainment System-only games
Now Production games
Platform games
Game Gear games
Single-player video games
Super Nintendo Entertainment System games
Super Nintendo Entertainment System-only games
Video game franchises
Video games about reptiles
Video games developed in Japan
Virtual Console games
Virtual Console games for Wii U